William Francis Charles "Bill" Gooden (September 8, 1923 – December 17, 1998) was a Canadian ice hockey left winger who hit the 20-goal mark seven times in the AHL.  He also played in 53 games for the New York Rangers in the NHL during the 1940s.

Awards and achievements 
 MJHL Championship (1942)
Memorial Cup Championship  (1942)
AHL Second All-Star Team (1951)
"Honoured Member" of the Manitoba Hockey Hall of Fame

External links

1923 births
1998 deaths
Clinton Comets players
Fort Worth Rangers players
New York Rangers players
Portage Terriers players
Ice hockey people from Winnipeg
Winnipeg Maroons players
Canadian expatriate ice hockey players in the United States
Canadian ice hockey left wingers